A general election was held in the U.S. state of Mississippi on November 3, 2015. All of Mississippi's executive officers were up for election. Primary elections were held on August 4, 2015, with primary runoffs to be held on August 25, 2015 if no candidate received a majority in the primary. The filing deadline for primary ballot access was February 27.

Governor

Incumbent Republican Governor Phil Bryant won re-election to a second and final term in office. He was challenged in the Republican primary by Mitch Young.

Retired firefighter Robert Gray, physician Valerie Short and attorney Vicki Slater ran for the Democratic nomination.

Lieutenant Governor

Incumbent Republican Lieutenant Governor Tate Reeves ran for re-election to a second term in office. He was challenged in the primary by teacher Alisha Nelson McElhenney. Secretary of State Delbert Hosemann, State Senator and candidate for the U.S. Senate in 2014 Chris McDaniel and State Senator Michael Watson all considered running against Reeves in the Republican primary, but none did so. 

Former Republican State Senator and former Republican Madison County Supervisor Tim Johnson won the Democratic primary against actor and candidate for Mayor of Greenwood in 2013 Jelani Barr. Mississippi Public Service Commissioner Brandon Presley was a potential Democratic candidate but instead ran for re-election.   

Reeves won the general election against Johnson.

Democratic primary

Candidates
Jelani Barr, actor and candidate for Mayor of Greenwood in 2013
Tim Johnson, former Republican State Senator and former Madison County Supervisor

Results

Republican primary

Candidates
Tate Reeves, incumbent 
Alisha Nelson McElhenney, teacher

Results

General election

Results

Secretary of State

Incumbent Republican Secretary of State Delbert Hosemann considered running for Lieutenant Governor against Tate Reeves in the Republican primary. However, he chose to run for re-election to a third term in office instead. Potential Republican candidates for Secretary of State included State Senator Michael Watson and attorney and Hosemann's former Chief of Staff Cory Wilson had he chosen to retire.

Retired firefighter Charles Graham ran for the Democrats. State Senator David Blount and former Secretary of State Dick Molpus were potential Democratic candidates, but neither chose to run.

Hosemann won in the general election against Graham.

Democratic nomination

Candidate
Charles Graham, retired firefighter

Reform nomination

Candidate 

 Randy Walker

Republican primary

Candidate
Delbert Hosemann, incumbent

Results

General election

Results

Attorney General

Incumbent Democratic Attorney General Jim Hood had been mentioned as a potential candidate for Governor, but he instead ran for re-election to a fourth term in office.

The only candidate to file for the Republican nomination was Assistant U.S. Attorney Mike Hurst. Attorney Russ Latino considered running but declined to do so. Secretary of State Delbert Hosemann, State Senator Chris McDaniel, State Senator Michael Watson, Jackson County District Attorney Tony Lawrence, Madison and Rankin Counties' District Attorney Michael Guest were all mentioned as potential Republican candidates. State Representative Mark Baker and attorney, author and former Madison County Supervisor Andy Taggart declined to run.

Hood won in the general election against Hurst.

Democratic nomination

Candidate
Jim Hood, incumbent

Republican primary

Candidate
Mike Hurst, Assistant U.S. Attorney

Results

General election

Results

State Auditor

Incumbent Republican State Auditor Stacey Pickering ran for re-election to a third term in office. Pickering was challenged in the Republican primary by Mary Hawkins-Butler, the Mayor of Madison. State Senator Michael Watson had considered running but did not do so.

Jocelyn Pritchett, an engineer, ran as a Democrat. Charles Graham, a retired firefighter, had been running for the office, but decided to run for Secretary of State instead.

Pickering won in the general election against Pritchett.

Democratic nomination

Candidate
Jocelyn Pritchett, engineer

Reform nomination

Candidate 

 Lajena Walley

Republican primary

Candidates
Stacey Pickering, incumbent 
Mary Hawkins-Butler, the Mayor of Madison

Results

General election

Results

State Treasurer

Incumbent Republican State Treasurer Lynn Fitch ran for re-election to a second term in office. Attorney David McRae, whose family formerly owned the McRae's department store chain, ran against Fitch in the Republican primary. No Democrat filed to run for the office.

Fitch won in the primary and proceed to win in the general election against Reform party candidate Viola McFarland.

Reform nomination

Candidate 

 Viola McFarland

Republican primary

Candidates
Lynn Fitch, incumbent 
David McRae, attorney

Results

General election

Results

Commissioner of Agriculture and Commerce

Incumbent Republican Commissioner of Agriculture and Commerce Cindy Hyde-Smith ran for re-election to a second term in office against Addie Lee Green who ran as a Democrat. Hyde-Smith won in the general election against Green.

Democratic nomination

Candidate
Addie Lee Green

Reform nomination

Candidate

 Cathy L. Toole

Republican primary

Candidate
Cindy Hyde-Smith, incumbent

Results

General election

Results

Commissioner of Insurance

Incumbent Republican Commissioner of Insurance Mike Chaney ran for re-election to a third term in office. Businessman John Mosley ran against Chaney in the Republican primary.

Former State Representative and Director of the Mississippi Democratic Trust Brandon Jones was a possible Democratic candidate, though no Democrat filed to run for the office.

Chaney prevailed in the primary, guaranteeing his win in the general election.

Republican primary

Candidates
Mike Chaney, incumbent 
John Mosley, businessman

Results

General election

Results

Public Service Commission

Northern District
Incumbent Democratic Commissioner Brandon Presley had considered running for Governor and Lieutenant Governor, but decided not to and ran for re-election to a third term in office.

Presley won in the general election against Republican Mike Maynard.

Democratic nomination

Candidate 

 Brandon Presley, incumbent

Republican nomination

Candidate 

 Mike Maynard

General election

Results

Central District 
Incumbent Republican Commissioner Lynn Posey retired rather than run for re-election to a third term in office.

For the Republicans, Brent Bailey and attorney and 2003 candidate for Governor Mitch Tyner ran in the primary. Other potential Republican candidates were former State Senator and candidate for State Treasurer in 2011 Lee Yancey and Jason Cochran, a utility construction company project manager, the son of former Commissioner Nielsen Cochran and nephew of U.S. Senator Thad Cochran 

Bruce Burton and State Representative Cecil Brown ran for the Democrats. Robert Amos originally qualified as a Democratic candidate for this seat, but switched to run for the Central District of the Transportation Commission.

Brown faced off in the general election against Bailey and won.

Democratic primary

Candidates 

 Cecil Brown
 Bruce Wilder Burton

Results

Reform nomination

Candidate 

 LaTrice D. Notree

Republican primary

Candidates 

 Brent Bailey
 Tony Greer

Results

General election

Results

Southern District 
Incumbent Republican Commissioner Steve Renfroe, who was appointed to the office in September 2013 after Leonard Bentz resigned to become executive director of the South Mississippi Planning and Development District, decided not to run for election to a full term in office. State Senator Philip Moran and Hancock County Supervisor Steve Seymour ruled out running and 2011 candidate Travis Rose chose not to run again. Sam Britton, Mike Collier, and State Senator Tony Smith both ran for the Republican nomination, in which Britton won following a runoff against Smith.

Thomas Blanton filed to run as the Democratic candidate and received the nomination unopposed.

Britton won in the general election against Blanton.

Democratic primary

Candidates 

 Tom Blanton

Reform nomination

Candidate 
 Lonny Kenneth Spence

Republican primary

Candidates 

 Samuel F. "Sam" Britton, business investor
 Mike Collier
 Tony Smith, State Senator

Results

Runoff

General election

Results

Transportation Commission

Northern District 
Incumbent Republican Mike Tagert, who won a special election in 2011 following the death of Democratic Commissioner Bill Minor, ran for re-election to a second full term in office. He also ran in the May 2015 special election for Mississippi's 1st congressional district. Hernando Mayor Chip Johnson announced that he would run for the Republican nomination, but he withdrew from the race following Tagert's loss in the Congressional election. Candidate Jimmy Mills of Tupelo challenged Tagert in the primary.

Democrat Danny Woods of Winona filed for the Democrats and faced Tagert in the general election; Tagert won.

Republican primary

Candidates 

 Jimmie D. Mills
 Mike Tagert, incumbent

Results

Democratic nomination

Candidate 

 Danny Woods

General election

Results

Central District 
Incumbent Republican Commissioner Dick Hall, who was appointed to the Commission in 1999, ran for re-election to a fifth full term in office.

Robert Amos ran for the Democrats, as well as Mary Coleman and Natasha Magee-Woods. Former Jackson Mayor Harvey Johnson, Jr. was a potential Democratic candidate, but he did not run.

Hall won in the general election against Coleman.

Democratic primary

Candidates 

 Robert Amos
 Mary Coleman, State Representative
 Natasha Magee-Woods

Results

Runoff

Republican nomination

Candidate 

 Dick Hall, incumbent

Results

General election

Results

Southern District 
Incumbent Republican Commissioner Tom King ran for re-election to a second term in office. Chad Toney ran for the Democrats.

King won in the general election against Toney.

Democratic nomination

Candidate 

 Chad Toney

Reform nomination

Candidate 

 Sheranda Atkinson

Republican nomination

Candidate 

 Tom King, incumbent

Results

General election

Results

Special Congressional election

A special election for Mississippi's 1st congressional district was held to fill the term left by the vacancy created by the death of Alan Nunnelee. Nunnelee, a member of the Republican Party, died on February 6, 2015. The top-two primary was held on May 12, with Democrat Walter Zinn and Republican Trent Kelly advancing. Kelly defeated Zinn in the June 12 runoff election.

References